Alag Alag is a 1985 Hindi film starring Shashi Kapoor, Rajesh Khanna and Tina Munim in the lead roles, produced by Rajesh Khanna and directed by one of his favourite directors Shakti Samanta. The film is best remembered for the way it was shot in Kashmir, and its different storyline. It was inspired by the Pakistani movie Meherbani, which was produced by Parvez Malik in 1982. In 1992, Ram Awatar Agnihotri wrote that it was in this film that Munim showed the "first sparks" of the dedicated actress she would become.

Kishore Kumar did not accept any money from Rajesh Khanna for rendering the songs of this film. When Khanna asked why he would not accept, Kumar replied that he had got a fresh lease of life as a singer with Aradhana (1969) and since this was Khanna's first film as producer, he had no right to accept any money.

Plot

Chandni is from a poor family who desires to escape poverty. Finding that one shortcut to become rich is to marry a rich man, she sets off to Bombay. She meets a man whose stands near a car, assumes he is rich and asks him to marry her. When she finds out that he is not a rich man, she dumps him immediately. The man is actually Neeraj, who aims to become a playback singer in movies. He goes to every studio to meet musicians, but he does not succeed. Chandni lands in a bunglaw to escape from a goon. She plans to settle in the house and requests owner Doctor Rana to let her stay in the house. Dr. Rana finds Chandni is an innocent village girl and allows her to live in his house. Chandni takes charge of the home and dismisses the servants which annoys Rana. But he feels good about the presence of woman in his home after his wife's death.

Neeraj attempts to get recommendation from a social worker whose brother is a musician. He poses as a lame person to her but gets caught when he goes to treatment to Dr. Rana as Chandni exposes him. Neeraj gets angry at her and swears to ruin her plans, which scares Chandni. Chandni plans to make Dr. Rana propose marriage to her. Neeraj gets frustrated on his failed attempts to be a singer. He meets a famous film actress Saritha and requests her for a chance. Saritha invites him and he agrees. Saritha actually plans to marry him and not help with his ambitions. When Neeraj finds out, he leaves angrily. He realises that the reason is that he loves Chandni. Dr. Rana finds that Chandni is a good singer and makes her to change into a fashionable woman. Neeraj proposes to Chandni, but she refuses as she wants to marry a rich man. Neeraj repeatedly attempts to win her love and finally Chandni accepts him. Chandni finds that Dr. Rana actually has loved her as his daughter and feels bad for her immature behaviour.

Neeraj manages to get a chance to sing and re-unites with his rich parents. While on his way to meet Chandni, he meets with an accident and loses his voice. Dr. Rana dies of illness and Chandni is again back to her old life. When Chandni meets Neeraj on the road, he leaves, unwilling to be a burden for Chandni, but Chandni believes that Neeraj dumped her because she is poor. Neeraj decides to make Chandni a playback singer and supports her without revealing himself with the help of his mother. As expected, Chandni becomes a famous singer but she hates Neeraj for leaving her. The rest of the film deals with whether Chandni learns the truth about Neeraj and if he will get his voice back.

Cast

 Shashi Kapoor as Rana
 Rajesh Khanna as Neeraj
 Tina Munim as Chandni
 Om Prakash as Khan
 Deven Verma as Karim
 Gita Siddharth as Begum
 Bindu (actress) as Sarita
 Rajesh Puri as Sarita Sec.
 Bharat Bhushan
 Om Shivpuri
 Sushma Seth

Music
All lyrics were by Anand Bakshi and the music was by Rahul Dev Burman.
 "Tere naam ke siwa" - Kishore Kumar, Lata Mangeshkar
 "Kuch Humko Tumse Kehna Hai" - Kishore Kumar, Lata Mangeshkar
 "Kabhi Bekasi Ne Mara" - Kishore Kumar
 "Kagaz Kalam Dawaat" - Kishore Kumar, Lata Mangeshkar
 "Dil Mein Aag Lagaye" - Kishore Kumar
 "Dil Mein Aag Lagaye" (duet)  Kishore Kumar, Lata Mangeshkar
 "Jeevan Ki Yehi Hai Kahani" - Lata Mangeshkar
 "Jeevan Ki Yehi Hai Kahani" (sad) - Lata Mangeshkar
 "Raam Rahim mein Antar Naahin" - Asha Bhosle, K. J. Yesudas
 "Roop Tera Mastana" - Kavita Krishnamurthy

References

External links
 

1985 films
1985 romantic drama films
Indian romantic drama films
1980s Hindi-language films
Films directed by Shakti Samanta
Films scored by R. D. Burman